Governor Pattison may refer to:

 John M. Pattison (1847–1906), 43rd Governor of Ohio
 Robert E. Pattison (1850–1904), 19th Governor of Pennsylvania

See also
Governor Patterson (disambiguation)
 Okey Patteson (1898–1989), 23rd Governor of West Virginia